The Franciscan Brothers of Peace is a Roman Catholic, Franciscan association for men. It was founded in 1982 by Michael Gaworski. It was recognized as a public association of the faithful in 1994 by Archbishop Roach. The mother house of the order is in Saint Paul, Minnesota, United States, in the Roman Catholic Archdiocese of Saint Paul and Minneapolis.  they were 11 brothers. In keeping with their anti-abortion charism, the Brothers advocate for the unborn, the handicapped, the elderly and the poor.

Founders
Michael Gaworski was born in Tulsa, Oklahoma July 31, 1958, and grew up in St. Paul, Minnesota. Active in the  Catholic Charismatic Renewal movement, he became attracted to Franciscan spirituality after reading the Little Flowers of Saint Francis (Fioretti).  He graduated from Saint Thomas Academy in 1977.

The son of Charles and Mary Kaye O'Donnell, Paul Joseph O'Donnell was born December 15, 1959. He received his Bachelor of Arts Degree in Communications from the University of Saint Thomas in Saint Paul, Minnesota, in 1982. In 1986 O'Donnell and Gaworski founded P.E.A.C.E (renamed in 1986 Pro-Life Action Ministries). O'Donnell participated in thousands of prayer vigils and rallies at abortion facilities, and became a spokesperson for the fight against active euthanasia.

Beginnings  
After attending the National Charismatic Renewal Conference held at Notre Dame University in South Bend, Indiana, in May 1982, Gawaorski, along with O'Donnell founded the Franciscan Brothers of Peace. In 1986, the Brotherhood was given canonical status as a Private Association of the Faithful.

In 1991 Gaworski contracted a bacterial pneumonia which left him profoundly disabled. The Brothers assumed his 24-hour care. This experience led them to expand their ministry to advocate for brain injured persons.

On January 1, 1994, Archbishop John R. Roach,  of the Roman Catholic Archdiocese of Saint Paul and Minneapolis designated the Brotherhood a Public Association of the Faithful. Michael Gaworski died August 28, 2003.

Paul Joseph O'Donnell, longtime guardian (superior) of the Franciscan Brothers of Peace was also a founding board member of Human Life Alliance. O'Donnell died February 20, 2015, at the age of 55.

Apostolate
In November 2009 the Brothers conducted a holiday grocery drive which provided both Thanksgiving and Christmas dinners to 575 families. In spring 2011 over 800 pounds of canned food was delivered to the Brothers "food shelf" program through the "Food for Fines" program of the University of St. Thomas library.

The Brothers work with the Center For Victims of Torture to provide for the temporary housing, transportation and clothing, nutritional, communication, etc., needs of international victims of torture.

The Queen of Peace Friary is located in St. Paul, Minnesota.

Notes

External links
Franciscan Brothers of Peace
 Goodnough, Abby. "In Two Friars, Family Finds Spiritual Support and More", The New York Times, March 5, 2005

Men's congregations of the Franciscan Third Order Regular
Organizations based in Saint Paul, Minnesota
Christian organizations established in 1982
Catholic Church in Minnesota
Roman Catholic Ecclesiastical Province of Saint Paul and Minneapolis
Franciscan organizations
Catholic religious institutes established in the 20th century
1982 establishments in Minnesota
Associations of the Christian faithful